Iain Dilthey (born 1971 in Scotland) is a British film director.

Filmography 
 Ich werde dich auf Händen tragen (2000)
 The Longing (2002)
 Gefangene (2006)

Awards 
He was awarded the Golden Leopard at the 2002 Locarno International Film Festival for The Longing.

References

External links 

 

1971 births
Scottish film directors
German-language film directors
Living people